Wathena (YTB-825) was a United States Navy  named for Wathena, Kansas.

Construction

The contract for Wathena was awarded 9 August 1971. She was laid down on 4 April 1973 at Marinette, Wisconsin, by Marinette Marine and launched 6 September 1973.

Operational history

Placed in service soon thereafter at Norfolk, Virginia, in the 5th Naval District, Wathena provided assistance and towing services there until probably 1997.

Stricken from the Navy Directory 28 October 1997, Wathena was sold by the General Services Administration 17 May 2000. Renamed Patrick McAllister, ex-Wathena is in commercial service.

References

External links
 
www.mcallistertowing.com Patrick McAllister

Natick-class large harbor tugs
Ships built by Marinette Marine
1973 ships